Ghettolimpo (a portmanteau of 'ghetto' and 'Olimpo', Italian for Olympus) is the second studio album by Italian singer-songwriter Mahmood. The album was released on 11 June 2021 and includes the singles "Rapide", "Dorado", "Inuyasha", "Zero" and "Klan".

Track listing

Charts

Weekly charts

Year-end charts

Certifications

Year-end lists

References

2021 albums